The electoral district of Canning was an electorate in the state of Western Australia. The electorate, which was named for the Canning River which ran through it, was first contested at the 1897 election, but was abolished prior to the 1901 election, with most of its territory transferred to the new seat of South Perth. However, for the 1904 election, South Perth was abolished and Canning re-created. Canning was abolished for a second time in the 1988 redistribution.

Canning covered much of Perth's inner southern region, being reduced progressively as suburban areas such as Applecross, South Perth, Victoria Park and Belmont developed and became populous enough to require their own electorates. By the time of its dissolution it corresponded approximately with the present-day Kenwick district and had become a safe Labor Party seat.

Geography
Canning initially covered all the land south of the Swan River between North Lake Road, Alfred Cove and Epsom Avenue, Redcliffe, extending south and southeast to what are now South Street, Roe Highway and Brook Road. Most of this area was rural at the time, and at the 1897 election contained only 321 enrolled voters, but from the 1920s onwards and especially after World War II, suburban development along with electoral reform resulted in areas meeting the threshold to require an elected member. In the 1929 redistribution, Victoria Park was established and areas northeast of Orrong Road were moved into Middle Swan. Other areas were split in subsequent redistributions:

 1948: South Perth and Melville
 1955: Beeloo
 1966: Clontarf
 1976: Murdoch

In its final incarnation, from 1983 until 1989, Canning included the suburbs of Beckenham, Ferndale, Kenwick, Langford, Lynwood, Thornlie and Wattle Grove, and parts of Cannington and East Cannington.

Members for Canning

Election results

References

Canning
1897 establishments in Australia
1901 disestablishments in Australia
1904 establishments in Australia
1989 disestablishments in Australia
Constituencies established in 1897
Constituencies disestablished in 1901
Constituencies established in 1904
Constituencies disestablished in 1989